Simpsonichthys trilineatus is a species of killifish from the family Rivulidae.
It is found in the São Francisco River basin in Brazil. in South America. 

References

Costa, W.J.E.M., 2003. Rivulidae (South American Annual Fishes). p. 526-548. In R.E. Reis, S.O. Kullander and C.J. Ferraris, Jr. (eds.) Checklist of the Freshwater Fishes of South and Central America. Porto Alegre: EDIPUCRS, Brasil.

trilineatus
Taxa named by Wilson José Eduardo Moreira da Costa
Taxa named by Gilberto Campello Brasil
Fish described in 1994